Karkhano is a market area located on the western side of Peshawar, Khyber Pakhtunkhwa, Pakistan, near the Khyber Tribal District, which in turn borders Afghanistan. The market was established in 1985 has more than 4,500 shops, owned by Pashtun traders. The name Kārkhānō means "industries" in  Pashto language. On the right side of the markets are many industries which are actually located in the Hayatabad industrial estate. As the industries emerged in this area so did these markets. The people in Peshawar usually visit these markets because the prices of commodities in the shops are less than in other commercial parts of Peshawar. This market gets a huge amount of contraband from smugglers. The Market sells anything from electronics to clothing including clothes, cosmetics, toys, watches, cigars, video games, shoes, etc. The rising price of oil has seen a discount price of smuggled petrol in the market.

Main markets of Karkhano
United Plaza
Shah Shopping Centre
G.B Market
Shaheen Market
Ameen Market
Sitara Market
Al-Haj Market
Kabul Shopping Plaza
National Market
Peerano Market
Kabul Market
Malak Taj Market 
Awami Market
Khyber Market
Shinwari Market
S.S Plaza
Royal Plaza
Bejli Market
Palace Market 
Khalid Market
Afghan Market
Hussain Market
Makkah Market
S.G Plaza
Jan Plaza
Afridi Plaza
M.S Market
Haroon Market

Incident

References

Economy of Peshawar